The Broken Sword is a fantasy novel  by American writer Poul Anderson, originally published on 5 November 1954. It was issued in a revised edition by Ballantine Books as the twenty-fourth volume of their Ballantine Adult Fantasy series in January 1971. The original text was returned to print by Gollancz in 2002. The novel is set during the Viking Age and the story contains many references to the Norse mythology.

Plot
The book tells the story of Skafloc, elven-fosterling and originally son of Orm the Strong. The story begins with the marriage of Orm the Strong and Aelfrida of the English. Orm kills a witch's family on the land and later half-converts to Christianity, but quarrels with the local priest and sends him off the land. Meanwhile, an elf named Imric, with the help of the witch, seeks to capture the newly born son of Orm. In his place, Imric leaves a changeling called Valgard. The real son of Orm is taken away to elven lands and named Skafloc by the elves who raise him. As the story continues, both Skafloc and Valgard have significant roles in the war between the trolls and the elves.

Reception and influence
Anthony Boucher praised the original edition as "a magnificent saga of the interplay of gods, demigods, faerie, heroes and men." Groff Conklin described the novel as "a rip-snorting, bloody, imitation-Norse epic containing all the elements of faerie". E. F. Bleiler, commenting on the 1971 revised edition, declared that "The first portion of this novel is perhaps the finest American heroic fantasy, with good characterizations, excellent surface detail, good plotting, and an admirable recreation of the mood of the Old Norse literature. But the story ends in a mad scramble and unconvincing slaughter".

British fantasy writer Michael Moorcock has written that The Broken Sword greatly influenced his stories; Moorcock's Elric of Melniboné series features a magic sword, Stormbringer, which has many similarities to Skafloc's sword. Moorcock further declared The Broken Sword superior to Tolkien, calling it "a fast-paced doom-drenched tragedy in which human heroism, love and ambition, manipulated by amoral gods, elves and trolls, led inevitably to tragic consequences." Despite his admiration of the original 1954 edition, Moorcock criticized the revised 1971 text, stating that the revised edition "weakened" the novel.

Writing style
The original 1954 text is known for its unique prose styling which makes liberal use of archaic words, spellings and phrasings. Examples include spelling "fairy" as "faerie", the word "glaive" in place of "sword", and archaic phrasing such as the word "will" in place of "want". The 1971 revised text frequently replaces and at times altogether removes some of these stylings. Author Poul Anderson explained these alterations in the introduction to the 1971 edition, referring to his younger self in the third person: A generation lies between us. I would not myself write anything so headlong, so prolix, and so unrelievedly savage. This young, in many ways naive lad who bore my name could, all unwittingly, give readers a wrong impression of my work and me. At the same time, I don’t feel free to tamper with what he has done.

Adaptation
A partial adaptation of the novel, done as a serialized black-and-white graphic novel, was adapted by fantasy writer Tom Reamy and illustrated by professional fantasy artist George Barr. This was published during the mid-to-late 1960s over several issues of Reamy's twice Hugo Award–nominated science fiction fanzine Trumpet; the adaptation was never completed, though there were revived plans underway to do so at the time of Reamy's death in late 1977.

References

General sources

External links 
 

1954 American novels
1954 fantasy novels
American fantasy novels
Novels by Poul Anderson
Novels set in the Viking Age
Heroic fantasy
Abelard-Schuman books